The Kentucky Open is a tournament for professional female tennis players played on indoor hard courts. The event is classified as a $100,000 ITF Women's Circuit tournament and has been held in Nicholasville, Kentucky, United States, since 2020.

Past finals

Singles

Doubles

External links 
 ITF search
 Official website

ITF Women's World Tennis Tour
Recurring sporting events established in 2020
Hard court tennis tournaments
Tennis tournaments in the United States
2020 establishments in Kentucky
Nicholasville, Kentucky